Gluta is a genus of plant in the subfamily Anacardioideae of the family Anacardiaceae. Species can be found in Madagascar, India, Indo-China, Malesia through to New Guinea.

Before the work of Ding Hou, several species were placed in the genus Melanorrhoea.

Species

, Plants of the World online has 34 accepted species:

Toxicity 
The plants can cause contact dermatitis, in the same fashion as poison ivy and poison oak.

References 

 
Taxonomy articles created by Polbot
Anacardiaceae genera